The 1939 Stanford Indians football team represented Stanford University in during the 1939 college football season. Seventh-year head coach Claude "Tiny" Thornhill led the team to a 1–7–1 record, which ultimately contributed to his relief at the end of the season. He was replaced by Clark Shaughnessy, who surprised critics by leading the following year's team, largely made up of the same players, to the Rose Bowl. Shaughnessy noted that the players were not suited to the single-wing offense that Thornhill had employed.

Before the season, the Stanford Board of Athletic Control retained Thornhill as head coach, despite opposition from some of the alumni base. The Indians finished last in the Pacific Coast Conference with a 0–6–1 record against league opponents. It was the first time in history that Stanford failed to win a single Pacific Coast Conference game in a season. Contemporary sources called the 1939 squad the worst football team to represent Stanford University in the history of the program.

Stanford's only victory came in the season finale against Dartmouth at the Polo Grounds in New York City. At halftime, Stanford trailed 3–0, and Thornhill and his assistants, at a loss for words, asked former "Vow Boys" back Bones Hamilton to deliver a halftime pep talk. He told the downtrodden players, "You are by far and large the worst group of players who have ever worn the Stanford red." The insult motivated the team to score 14 unanswered points to take away their only win of the season.

After the game, the United Press wrote, "Stanford, the worst team the West Coast has produced in years, pulled the day's gridiron surprise by walloping the strong Dartmouth eleven."

Schedule

Players drafted by the NFL

References

Stanford
Stanford Cardinal football seasons
Stanford Indians football